In aviation, a single frequency approach (SFA) is a service for a military single-piloted turbojet aircraft to use a single UHF frequency during their landing approach. Circumstances permitting, pilots will not be required to change their frequency when they switch from ARTCC to terminal facility control when conducting an SFA.

In the U.S., per the FAA, controllers are not allowed to require a frequency change from aircraft conducting an SFA unless:
 Pilot has completed landing or low approach
 Aircraft is in VFR conditions during daylight hours
 Pilot requests a frequency change
 Emergency situation exists
 Aircraft is cleared for a visual approach
 Pilot cancels their IFR flight plan

If a change of control is necessary, controllers will hand off the frequency to each other, instead of having the pilots change the frequency on their radio.

Airbands
American military aviation